Osmium is a chemical element with the symbol Os and atomic number 76. It is a hard, brittle, bluish-white transition metal in the platinum group that is found as a trace element in alloys, mostly in platinum ores. Osmium is the densest naturally occurring element. Manufacturers use its alloys with platinum, iridium, and other platinum-group metals to make fountain pen nib tipping, electrical contacts, and in other applications that require extreme durability and hardness.

Osmium is among the rarest elements in the Earth's crust, making up only 50 parts per trillion (ppt). It is estimated to be about 0.6 parts per billion in the universe and is therefore the rarest precious metal.

Characteristics

Physical properties

Osmium has a blue-gray tint and is the densest stable element; it is approximately twice as dense as lead and narrowly denser than iridium.

The reflectivity of single crystals of osmium is complex and strongly direction-dependent, with light in the red and near-infrared wavelengths being more strongly absorbed when polarized parallel to the c crystal axis than when polarized perpendicular to the c axis; the c-parallel polarization is also slightly more reflected in the mid-ultraviolet range. Reflectivity reaches a sharp minimum at around 1.5 eV (near-infrared) for the c-parallel polarization and at 2.0 eV (orange) for the c-perpendicular polarization, and peaks for both in the visible spectrum at around 3.0 eV (blue-violet).

Osmium is a hard but brittle metal that remains lustrous even at high temperatures. It has a very low compressibility. Because of its hardness, brittleness, low vapor pressure (the lowest of the platinum-group metals), and very high melting point (the fourth highest of all elements, after carbon, tungsten, and rhenium), solid osmium is difficult to machine, form, or work.

Chemical properties

Osmium forms compounds with oxidation states ranging from −4 to +8. The most common oxidation states are +2, +3, +4, and +8. The +8 oxidation state is notable for being the highest attained by any chemical element aside from iridium's +9 and is encountered only in xenon, ruthenium, hassium, iridium, and plutonium.

The most common compound exhibiting the +8 oxidation state is osmium tetroxide. This toxic compound is formed when powdered osmium is exposed to air. It is a very volatile, water-soluble, pale yellow, crystalline solid with a strong smell. Osmium powder has the characteristic smell of osmium tetroxide. Osmium tetroxide forms red osmates  upon reaction with a base. With ammonia, it forms the nitrido-osmates . Osmium tetroxide boils at 130 °C and is a powerful oxidizing agent. By contrast, osmium dioxide is black, non-volatile, and much less reactive and toxic.

Only two osmium compounds have major applications: osmium tetroxide for staining tissue in electron microscopy and for the oxidation of alkenes in organic synthesis, and the non-volatile osmates for organic oxidation reactions.

Osmium pentafluoride is known, but osmium trifluoride has not yet been synthesized. The lower oxidation states are stabilized by the larger halogens, so that the trichloride, tribromide, triiodide, and even diiodide are known. The oxidation state +1 is known only for osmium monoiodide (OsI), whereas several carbonyl complexes of osmium, such as triosmium dodecacarbonyl, represent oxidation state 0.

In general, the lower oxidation states of osmium are stabilized by ligands that are good σ-donors (such as amines) and π-acceptors (heterocycles containing nitrogen).

Despite its broad range of compounds in numerous oxidation states, osmium in bulk form at ordinary temperatures and pressures resists attack by all acids, including aqua regia, but is attacked by fused alkalis, hot nitric acid, and hot aqua regia.

Isotopes

Alpha decay is predicted for all the other naturally occurring isotopes, but this has never been observed, presumably due to very long half-lives. It is predicted that  and  can undergo double beta decay, but this radioactivity has not been observed yet.

It has also been used to measure the intensity of continental weathering over geologic time and to fix minimum ages for stabilization of the mantle roots of continental cratons. However, the most notable application of osmium isotopes in geology has been in conjunction with the abundance of iridium, to characterise the layer of shocked quartz along the Cretaceous–Paleogene boundary that marks the extinction of the non-avian dinosaurs 65 million years ago.

History
Osmium was discovered in 1803 by Smithson Tennant and William Hyde Wollaston in London, England. The discovery of osmium is intertwined with that of platinum and the other metals of the platinum group. Platinum reached Europe as platina ("small silver"), first encountered in the late 17th century in silver mines around the Chocó Department, in Colombia. The discovery that this metal was not an alloy, but a distinct new element, was published in 1748.
Chemists who studied platinum dissolved it in aqua regia (a mixture of hydrochloric and nitric acids) to create soluble salts. They always observed a small amount of a dark, insoluble residue. Joseph Louis Proust thought that the residue was graphite. Victor Collet-Descotils, Antoine François, comte de Fourcroy, and Louis Nicolas Vauquelin also observed iridium in the black platinum residue in 1803, but did not obtain enough material for further experiments. Later the two French chemists Fourcroy and Vauquelin identified a metal in a platinum residue they called ‘ptène’.

In 1803, Smithson Tennant analyzed the insoluble residue and concluded that it must contain a new metal. Vauquelin treated the powder alternately with alkali and acids and obtained a volatile new oxide, which he believed was of this new metal—which he named ptene, from the Greek word  (ptènos) for winged. However, Tennant, who had the advantage of a much larger amount of residue, continued his research and identified two previously undiscovered elements in the black residue, iridium and osmium. He obtained a yellow solution (probably of cis–[Os(OH)2O4]2−) by reactions with sodium hydroxide at red heat. After acidification he was able to distill the formed OsO4. He named it osmium after Greek osme meaning "a smell", because of the ashy and smoky smell of the volatile osmium tetroxide. Discovery of the new elements was documented in a letter to the Royal Society on June 21, 1804.

Uranium and osmium were early successful catalysts in the Haber process, the nitrogen fixation reaction of nitrogen and hydrogen to produce ammonia, giving enough yield to make the process economically successful. At the time, a group at BASF led by Carl Bosch bought most of the world's supply of osmium to use as a catalyst. Shortly thereafter, in 1908, cheaper catalysts based on iron and iron oxides were introduced by the same group for the first pilot plants, removing the need for the expensive and rare osmium.

Nowadays osmium is obtained primarily from the processing of platinum and nickel ores.

Occurrence

Osmium is the least abundant stable element in Earth's crust, with an average mass fraction of 50 parts per trillion in the continental crust.

Osmium is found in nature as an uncombined element or in natural alloys; especially the iridium–osmium alloys, osmiridium (iridium rich), and iridosmium (osmium rich). In nickel and copper deposits, the platinum-group metals occur as sulfides (i.e.), tellurides (e.g.), antimonides (e.g.), and arsenides (e.g.); in all these compounds platinum is exchanged by a small amount of iridium and osmium. As with all of the platinum-group metals, osmium can be found naturally in alloys with nickel or copper.

Within Earth's crust, osmium, like iridium, is found at highest concentrations in three types of geologic structure: igneous deposits (crustal intrusions from below), impact craters, and deposits reworked from one of the former structures. The largest known primary reserves are in the Bushveld Igneous Complex in South Africa, though the large copper–nickel deposits near Norilsk in Russia, and the Sudbury Basin in Canada are also significant sources of osmium. Smaller reserves can be found in the United States. The alluvial deposits used by pre-Columbian people in the Chocó Department, Colombia are still a source for platinum-group metals. The second large alluvial deposit was found in the Ural Mountains, Russia, which is still mined.

Production

Osmium is obtained commercially as a by-product from nickel and copper mining and processing. During electrorefining of copper and nickel, noble metals such as silver, gold and the platinum-group metals, together with non-metallic elements such as selenium and tellurium, settle to the bottom of the cell as anode mud, which forms the starting material for their extraction. Separating the metals requires that they first be brought into solution. Several methods can achieve this, depending on the separation process and the composition of the mixture. Two representative methods are fusion with sodium peroxide followed by dissolution in aqua regia, and dissolution in a mixture of chlorine with hydrochloric acid. Osmium, ruthenium, rhodium, and iridium can be separated from platinum, gold, and base metals by their insolubility in aqua regia, leaving a solid residue. Rhodium can be separated from the residue by treatment with molten sodium bisulfate. The insoluble residue, containing ruthenium, osmium, and iridium, is treated with sodium oxide, in which Ir is insoluble, producing water-soluble ruthenium and osmium salts.

After it is dissolved, osmium is separated from the other platinum-group metals by distillation or extraction with organic solvents of the volatile osmium tetroxide. The first method is similar to the procedure used by Tennant and Wollaston. Both methods are suitable for industrial-scale production. In either case, the product is reduced using hydrogen, yielding the metal as a powder or sponge that can be treated using powder metallurgy techniques.

Neither the producers nor the United States Geological Survey published any production amounts for osmium. In 1971, estimations of the United States production of osmium as a byproduct of copper refining was 2000 troy ounces (62 kg). Between 2010 and 2019, annual US imports of osmium ranged from less than 0.5 kg to 856 kg, averaging 157 kg/year.

One method for producing osmium is from rhenium. , which occurs 62.6% in nature, could absorb a neutron to become .

Applications
Because of the volatility and extreme toxicity of its oxide, osmium is rarely used in its pure state, but is instead often alloyed with other metals for high-wear applications. Osmium alloys such as osmiridium are very hard and, along with other platinum-group metals, are used in the tips of fountain pens, instrument pivots, and electrical contacts, as they can resist wear from frequent operation. They were also used for the tips of phonograph styli during the late 78 rpm and early "LP" and "45" record era, circa 1945 to 1955. Osmium-alloy tips were significantly more durable than steel and chromium needle points, but wore out far more rapidly than competing, and costlier, sapphire and diamond tips, so they were discontinued.

Osmium tetroxide has been used in fingerprint detection and in staining fatty tissue for optical and electron microscopy. As a strong oxidant, it cross-links lipids mainly by reacting with unsaturated carbon–carbon bonds and thereby both fixes biological membranes in place in tissue samples and simultaneously stains them. Because osmium atoms are extremely electron-dense, osmium staining greatly enhances image contrast in transmission electron microscopy (TEM) studies of biological materials. Those carbon materials otherwise have very weak TEM contrast. Another osmium compound, osmium ferricyanide (OsFeCN), exhibits similar fixing and staining action.

The tetroxide and its derivative potassium osmate are important oxidants in organic synthesis. For the Sharpless asymmetric dihydroxylation, which uses osmate for the conversion of a double bond into a vicinal diol, Karl Barry Sharpless was awarded the Nobel Prize in Chemistry in 2001. OsO4 is very expensive for this use, so KMnO4 is often used instead, even though the yields are less for this cheaper chemical reagent.

In 1898, the Austrian chemist Auer von Welsbach developed the Oslamp with a filament made of osmium, which he introduced commercially in 1902. After only a few years, osmium was replaced by tungsten, which is more abundant (and thus cheaper) and more stable. Tungsten has the highest melting point among all metals, and its use in light bulbs increases the luminous efficacy and life of incandescent lamps.

The light bulb manufacturer Osram (founded in 1906, when three German companies, Auer-Gesellschaft, AEG and Siemens & Halske, combined their lamp production facilities) derived its name from the elements of osmium and Wolfram (the latter is German for tungsten).

Like palladium, powdered osmium effectively absorbs hydrogen atoms. This could make osmium a potential candidate for a metal-hydride battery electrode. However, osmium is expensive and would react with potassium hydroxide, the most common battery electrolyte.

Osmium has high reflectivity in the ultraviolet range of the electromagnetic spectrum; for example, at 600 Å osmium has a reflectivity twice that of gold. This high reflectivity is desirable in space-based UV spectrometers, which have reduced mirror sizes due to space limitations. Osmium-coated mirrors were flown in several space missions aboard the Space Shuttle, but it soon became clear that the oxygen radicals in low Earth orbit are abundant enough to significantly deteriorate the osmium layer.

The only known clinical use of osmium is synovectomy in arthritic patients in Scandinavia. It involves the local administration of osmium tetroxide (OsO4), which is a highly toxic compound. The lack of reports of long-term side effects suggest that osmium itself can be biocompatible, though this depends on the osmium compound administered. In 2011, osmium(VI) and osmium(II) compounds were reported to show anticancer activity in vivo; this indicated a promising future for using osmium compounds as anticancer drugs.

Precautions
Bulk osmium metal is not very toxic or reactive. Instead, the most important safety concern is the potential for the formation of osmium tetroxide (OsO4), which is both volatile and very poisonous. At room temperature, this reaction is thermodynamically favorable, and its rate depends on the surface area of the metal. Powdered osmium oxidizes quickly enough that samples can smell like OsO4 when handled in air. Most forms of osmium metal should not be handled by untrained individuals or by anyone without access to the proper workspace (which may need chemical ventilation or an inert atmosphere). 

Heating bulk osmium or osmium-containing alloys in air may also result in exposure to OsO4.

Price
Osmium, like other precious metals, is measured by troy weight and grams. The market price of osmium has not changed in decades, primarily because little change has occurred in supply and demand. In addition to being scarce, osmium is difficult to work with, has few uses, and is a challenge to store safely because of the metal's toxic gas made when oxygenated.

While the price of $400 per troy ounce has remained steady since the 1990s, inflation since that time has led to the metal losing about one-third of its value in the two decades prior to 2018.

References

External links

 Osmium at The Periodic Table of Videos (University of Nottingham)
 Flegenheimer, J. (2014). The mystery of the disappearing isotope. Revista Virtual de Química. V. XX. Available at Wayback Machine
 

 
Chemical elements
Transition metals
Noble metals
Precious metals
Native element minerals
Chemical elements with hexagonal close-packed structure
Platinum-group metals